Somon Air (Russian and Tajik: Сомон Эйр) is a private airline in Tajikistan headquartered in Dushanbe and based at Dushanbe International Airport.

History
The airline started operating on 5 February 2008 with regular flights to Moscow. Somon Air also serves as the official carrier of President of the Republic of Tajikistan and other Tajikistan high-ranking officials. Since its formation, Somon Air has been primarily focused on passenger service and transportation to Eastern Europe and other locations. Most flights to international destinations operate from Dushanbe.

In early August 2009, Somon Air joined IATA's (International Air Transport Association) IATA Billing and Settlement Plan. As of January 2013, the airline participates in 14 BSP countries. BSP is a settlement system designed to simplify the selling, reporting and remitting procedures between passenger sales agents and airlines globally. In April 2013, Somon Air jointed the IATA Multilateral Interline Traffic Agreement (MITA). The IATA Multilateral Interline Traffic Agreement (MITA) is an agreement where passengers and cargo use a standard traffic document on various transportation modes to reach the final destination on a particular routing.

In June 2013, Somon Air became the member of IATA Clearing House which provides a service for settling of interline accounts, airline-associated companies and travel partners.

In September 2017, Somon Air obtained the IATA membership and is working on signing interline agreements with some of major airlines from the Commonwealth of Independent States (CIS), Europe and Asia.

In July 2019, Somon Air opened an aviation training center for aviation specialists at its headquarters in Dushanbe.

On 18 December 2019, Somon Air received the award "Brand of the Year 2019" bestowed by the Republic of Tajikistan.

On 18 June 2021 the first independent flight of the only female pilot of Somon Air, Tatyana Afenteva, took place. Tatyana successfully completed the flight as a co-pilot on a regular flight on the Dushanbe-Tashkent-Dushanbe route.

On August 30, 2022, Somon Air received the first of two Boeing 737-800 aircraft with a cabin configuration of 189 economy class passenger seats. The aircraft received on operating lease from one of the largest USA based leasing companies - ACG.

On September 8, 2022, the airline received on operating lease from ACG company the second Boeing 737-800 aircraft.

Destinations
Somon Air flies to following destinations as of June 2022:

Fleet

Current fleet
The Somon Air fleet comprises the following aircraft (as of November 2019):

Fleet development
Somon Air signed a memorandum of understanding to purchase a Boeing 787-8 at the 2018 Dubai Air Show for further fleet development. This has not yet been taken up. The company still hoped to launch wide-body flights that year with a 767-300ER. The airline was considering the purchase of four Embraer 190-E2, to replace older Boeing 737 Classic aircraft. The airline planned to commence service of the new Embraers by the end of 2018, but by September 2019 there had been no further announcement. In November 2019 Somon Air signed a Memorandum of Understanding with the Airbus group of companies under which the airline intends to acquire helicopters and the latest Airbus family aircraft from direct manufacturer.

References

External links
 
 Official website

Airlines of Tajikistan
Airlines established in 2008
2008 establishments in Asia